Laurence Kim Peek (November 11, 1951December 19, 2009) was an American savant. Known as a "megasavant", he had an exceptional memory, but he also experienced social difficulties, possibly resulting from a developmental disability related to congenital brain abnormalities. He was the inspiration for the character Raymond Babbitt in the 1988 movie Rain Man. Although Peek was previously diagnosed with autism, he is now thought to have had FG syndrome. The Utah Film Center's Peek Award honors his legacy.

Early life

Laurence Kim Peek was born in Salt Lake City, Utah, with macrocephaly, damage to the cerebellum, and agenesis of the corpus callosum, a condition in which the bundle of nerves that connects the two hemispheres of the brain is missing; in Peek's case, secondary connectors such as the anterior commissure were also missing. There is speculation that his neurons made unusual connections due to the absence of a corpus callosum, resulting in an increased memory capacity. According to Peek's father, Fran (Francis) Peek, Kim was able to memorize things from the age of 16–20 months. Peek read books, memorized them, and then placed them upside down on the shelf to show that he had finished reading them, a practice he maintained all his life. He could speed through a book in about an hour and remember almost everything he had read, memorizing vast amounts of information in subjects ranging from history and literature, geography and numbers to sports, music and dates. Peek read by scanning the left page with his left eye, while reading the right page with his right eye.  According to an article in The Times newspaper, he could accurately recall the contents of at least 12,000 books.
Peek lived in Murray, Utah, and spent a considerable amount of his time reading at the Salt Lake City Library and demonstrating his capabilities at schools, with great help from his father.

Peek did not walk until he was four years old, and even then in a sidelong manner. He could not button up his shirt and had difficulty with other ordinary motor skills, presumably due to his damaged cerebellum, which normally coordinates motor activities. In psychological testing, Peek yielded superior ability in the performance sub-tests and limited ability in the verbal sub-tests, leading his overall IQ of 87 not to be considered a valid measure of his cognitive ability.

Rain Man
In 1984, screenwriter Barry Morrow met Peek in Arlington, Texas; the result of the meeting was the 1988 Academy Award-winning film Rain Man. The character of Raymond Babbitt, although inspired by Peek, was depicted as being an individual with autism. Dustin Hoffman, who portrayed Babbitt in the film, met Peek and other individuals that displayed savant mannerisms, studying their characteristics and nature in order to play the role as accurately as possible. The movie led to a number of requests for appearances, which increased Peek's self-confidence. Barry Morrow gave Peek his Oscar statuette to carry with him and show at these appearances; it has since been referred to as the "Most Loved Oscar Statue" because it has been held by more people than any other. Peek also enjoyed approaching strangers and showing them his talent for calendar calculations by telling them on which day of the week they were born and what news items were on the front page of major newspapers that day. Peek also appeared on television. He traveled with his father, who took care of him and performed many motor tasks that Peek found difficult.

Scientific investigation
In 2004, scientists at the Center for Bioinformatics Space Life Sciences at the NASA Ames Research Center examined Peek with a series of tests including computed tomography (CT scan) and magnetic resonance imaging (MRI). The intent was to create a three-dimensional view of his brain structure and to compare the images to MRI scans performed in 1988. These were the first tentative approaches in using non-invasive technology to further investigate Kim's savant abilities.

A 2008 study concluded that Peek probably had FG syndrome, a rare X chromosome-linked genetic syndrome that causes physical anomalies such as hypotonia (low muscle tone) and macrocephaly (abnormally large head).

Appearances
The Boy with the Incredible Brain, a BBC documentary
Brainman, a Discovery Channel documentary
Inside the Rain Man, a Discovery Channel documentary
Everything You Need to Know – The Brain, a Discovery Channel documentary
Human Computer, a Discovery Channel documentary
Medical Incredible, a Discovery Health Channel documentary
The Real Rain Man, a Discovery Health Channel documentary premiered on November 26, 2006
Ripley's Believe It or Not!
CNN interview by Richard Quest

World's Smartest People on The Learning Channel
Kim and his father were speakers at the inaugural meeting of the Athanasius Kircher Society.
Speaker at the Oxford Union
60 Minutes
Accidental Genius, a National Geographic Channel documentary
Superhuman, "Genius" episode, a Science Channel special premiered on November 7, 2008
Den Riktiga Rain Man (The Real Rain Man), a Swedish documentary that was aired July 6, 2006 on Sweden's channel four (TV-4)
Michael Vey 4

Death
Peek died of a heart attack at his home on December 19, 2009, aged 58.

Tributes
Barry Morrow put his own Oscar statuette on permanent loan to Salt Lake City in memory of Kim Peek and put forward the money for the Peek Award, which "pays tribute to artists, media makers, and film subjects who are positively impacting our society's perception of people with disabilities" and is given out by the Utah Film Center.

Further reading
Treffert, Darold A. & Christensen, Daniel D. "Inside the Mind of a Savant". Scientific American. December 2005. (requires subscription).

Portions of the text are the work of the Wisconsin Medical Society and Darold A. Treffert, M.D."Kim Peek - The Real Rain Man"

References

External links

 Kim Peek-The Real Rain Man - Wisconsin Medical Society
 

1951 births
2009 deaths
People from Murray, Utah
People from Salt Lake City
American Latter Day Saints
American people with disabilities
American mnemonists
Savants